The 1973–74 Ranji Trophy was the 40th season of the Ranji Trophy. Karnataka ended Bombay's sequence of 15 consecutive titles by defeating them on first innings in the semifinal. They defeated Rajasthan by 185 runs in the final to win their first Ranji Trophy.

Group stage

South Zone

North Zone

East Zone

West Zone

Central Zone

Knockout stage

Semi-finals

Final

Scorecards and averages
 Cricketarchive

References

External links
 

1974 in Indian cricket
Domestic cricket competitions in 1973–74
Ranji Trophy seasons